First dog may refer to:

 Domestication of the dog
 United States presidential pets
 First Dog on the Moon